Santa Claus. Battle of the Magi is a 2016 Russian Christmas fantasy action film directed by Aleksandr Voytinskiy and produced by Georgiy Malkov, Vladimir Polyakov and Lev Karasev. The film's protagonist is Masha, a girl who witnesses an epic battle of monsters with young magicians in the center of Moscow; one of the sorcerers saves the girl and leads her to a secret organization where she learns not only that Father Frost (Santa Claus) truly does exist, but also that the New Year is a real magical ritual.
It stars Taisiya Vilkova, with Nikita Volkov, Fyodor Bondarchuk, Aleksei Kravchenko, Egor Beroev, Ksenia Alfyorova, Sergey Badyuk, Irina Antonenko, Igor Chekhov and Filipp Gorenshteyn in supporting roles.

The premiere of the film in Russia took place on December 24, 2016, and it later appeared in Russian screens on the eve of the New Year 2017.

Plot
Young Masha is tormented by visions of flying fiery monsters. Mother worries about her daughter being bullied by classmates. But one day in the very center of Moscow Masha sees a battle of winged fire monsters with young people who call themselves magicians. One of them at the last moment, rescues Masha from the attack of a chimera. So Masha gets into a secret corporation, where she learns that Father Frost (Santa Claus) really exists and, leading an army of magicians able to control snow and ice, protects the Earth from the invasion of dark forces.

Cast

 Taisiya Vilkova as Mariya Petrova, called Masha, sees what others do not see thanks to the ice gene.
  as child Masha There was a girl Masha. As a child, her father left with her mother, after which visions began in her dreams and in reality. In the adult state, she had an ice gene, which led her to the Christmas tree guard - the defenders of the Christmas tree from the fiery chimeras. A little later, Masha opened the terrible secrets of the universe - about the silver threads, broken into needles, a magic staff and other addict's heresy, which writers caught in an extraordinary trip to the country of fantasy. Christmas trees and Santa Clauses of all stripes will battle against Karachun, who was determined to obtain the keys of the Guardians who had locked the moon sword.
 Nikita Volkov as Nikita Krutov, from Christmas trees. Does not want to be like everyone else.
 Fyodor Bondarchuk as Miran Morozov, the Father Frost (Santa Claus) - the oligarch Miran Morozov looks colorful. He has long hair and a beard. When he dresses in a long festive caftan and takes a magic staff, you really believe that before you the real Santa Claus is the most powerful white magician in the world.
 Aleksei Kravchenko as Karachun, the evil wizard. This role seems to have been created specifically for him. So harmoniously he looks on the screen. And it's amazing, because he used to play the role of positive characters more often: soldiers-heroes, special forces. But when he tried on the image of the main villain, it was his finest hour.
 Egor Beroev as Masha's father
 Ksenia Alfyorova as Masha's mother
 Sergey Badyuk as Dobrohot, the chief assistant of Santa Claus.
 Irina Antonenko as Lina
 Igor Chekhov as Ilya
 Filipp Gorenshteyn as Maks
 Vladimir Gostyukhin as Vitaliy Semenovich
  as Baba Lyuba
 Yan Tsapnik as participant of the auction
 Anastasiya Ukolova as Asya Raevskaya, Snegurochka (The Snow Maiden)
 Taras Glushakov as Stepan
 Maksim Pinsker as Santa Claus (II)
 Oleg Volku as Papay Noel
 Viktor Myutnikov as Daidi Na Nollaig
 Yevgeniy Saranchev as Ehee Dyshl
 Dmitriy Sitokhin as Khizir Ilyas
 Timur Koshelyov as Yolu Pukki
 Elina Sudyna as Irina Nikolaevna, music teacher
 Diana Pozharskaya as Elvira
 Peter Kovrizhnykh as Oleg Skvortsov

Production

Development
For two years of working on the script, the creators came up with and developed a mythology based on the rituals of celebrating the New Year in different periods of Russian history.
More than 50 different costumes were made for the shooting of the film. For the main hero of Father Frost (Santa Claus) created 8 images, and for his antagonist Karachun - 3 images.
Grimery spent several hours a day to create the most natural beards, mustaches and wigs for all the characters in the film.

Above creating a magical atmosphere in the film, a large creative team worked. Costume designers sewed more than 50 complex costumes: only Father Frost (Santa Claus) had 8 images. Artists, make-up artists every day spent 2–3 hours to create the image of the villain Karachun and about 4 hours for all the brothers of Father Frost (Santa Claus). Artists and graphic designers have come up with and built real new worlds: the Santa Claus Corporation with secret rooms, the archive where all letters to Santa Claus are stored, training halls where young magicians perfect their skills; the headquarters of the brothers Morozov at the North Pole; The den of the villain Karachun. And they also created a lot of "magic" items and creatures: the sleigh and the staff of Santa Claus, the spheres - the weapon with which the magicians control the snow element, the Lunar sword Karachun wants to possess, fire chimeras, snow owls and much more. On the set every day there was a supervisor of computer graphics, and in almost 70% of the scenes stuntmen participated.

Filming
The Location filming took place from December last year on the streets of New Year's Moscow, all the main and large-scale events of the tape unfolded in places not only iconic for the New Year, but also truly supporting the magic atmosphere with their festive decoration and illumination - the Central Children's Store on Lubyanka, Red Square, Tsaritsyno Palace, Patriarch Ponds and Tverskaya Street.

Release
Santa Claus. Battle of the Magi was released in the Russian Federation on December 24, 2016 by 20th Century Fox CIS.

Critical response
The film received mostly negative reviews in Russian media. He received only one positive review from the newspaper "Izvestia", which he called "quality family fantasy". All other reviews were neutral or negative. They wrote about the film: «The scenario, suffering from all existing mental disorders, was wiped out by a sick fantasy», "Rossiyskaya Gazeta", «It is possible to analyze the absurdities of the film indefinitely» (Film.ru), «The film leaves a sense of confusion» (Metro).

BadComedian has critically scrutinized its 2019 New Year's review called Frozen Fantasy.

References

External links 
 
 

2016 films
2010s Russian-language films
2010s Christmas films
2010s fantasy adventure films
2010s action adventure films
Russian Christmas films
Christmas war films
Christmas adventure films
Santa Claus in film
Russian fantasy adventure films
Russian fantasy action films
Russian action adventure films
Fantasy war films
Russian war films
Teen adventure films
Russian children's fantasy films
Russian coming-of-age films
High fantasy films
Magic realism films
2010s teen fantasy films
2010s romantic fantasy films
Films set around New Year
Films set in Moscow
Films set in Russia
Films directed by Aleksandr Voytinskiy